"Pareja del Año" is a song by Colombian singer Sebastián Yatra and Puerto Rican rapper and singer Myke Towers. It was released on April 16, 2021 through Universal Music Latin Entertainment. The song was produced by Andrés Torres and Mauricio Rengifo. The song peaked at No. 2 on the US Billboard Bubbling Under Hot 100 chart and No. 10 on the US Billboard Hot Latin Songs chart.

Background
At the beginning of April 2021, Sebastián Yatra announced his new song entitled "Pareja del Año" through a short preview. However, it was not yet known who would be the other artist that would be part of the song. It was later confirmed that the artist would be Myke Towers.

Composition and lyric
The song combines reggaeton instruments with other string instruments such as guitars, violins and cellos, Yatra spoke about the rhythm of the song which referred to the newness of reggaeton and latin pop.

The lyrics of the song talk about two boys in love with a girl, one explains that he is in love with a girl that he misses and the other tells that he is in love with a girl who is not his, but that together they would be the couple of the year.

Music video
The music video was released on April 16, 2021, the same day the single was released. It was directed by Daniel Durán and was recorded at the Adrienne Arsh Center in Miami, Florida. The music video shows Sebastián Yatra and Myke Towers in the theater along with a girl who is just watching them.

Charts

Weekly charts

Year-end charts

Certifications

See also
List of Billboard number-one Latin songs of 2021

References

External links
Lyrics of this song at Genius

2021 singles
2021 songs
Sebastián Yatra songs
Songs written by Sebastián Yatra
Songs written by Andrés Torres (producer)
Songs written by Mauricio Rengifo
Universal Music Latino singles
Number-one singles in Spain
Myke Towers songs